Alexandre Sabès Pétion (2 April 1770 – 29 March 1818) was the first president of the Republic of Haiti from 1807 until his death in 1818. One of Haiti's founding fathers, Pétion belonged to the revolutionary quartet that also includes Toussaint Louverture, Jean-Jacques Dessalines, and his later rival Henri Christophe. Regarded as an excellent artilleryman in his early adulthood, Pétion would distinguish himself as an esteemed military commander with experience leading both French and Haitian troops. The 1802 coalition formed by him and Dessalines against French forces led by Charles Leclerc would prove to be a watershed moment in the decade-long conflict, eventually culminating in the decisive Haitian victory at the Battle of Vertières in 1803.

Early life
Pétion was born "Anne Alexandre Sabès" in Port-au-Prince to Pascal Sabès, a wealthy French father and Ursula, a free mulatto woman, which made him a quadroon (a quarter African ancestry). Like other gens de couleur libres (free people of color) with wealthy fathers, Pétion was sent to France in 1788 to be educated and study at the Military Academy in Paris.

In Saint-Domingue, as in other French colonies such as Louisiane, the free people of color constituted a third caste between the whites and enslaved Africans. While restricted in political rights, many received social capital from their fathers and became educated and wealthy landowners, resented by the petits blancs, who were mostly minor tradesmen. Following the French Revolution, the gens de couleur led a rebellion to gain the voting and political rights which they believed were due them as French citizens; this was before the 1791 slave rebellion. At that time, most free people of color did not support freedom or political rights for slaves.

Haitian Revolution
Pétion returned to Saint-Domingue as a young man to take part in the Haitian Revolution, participating in skirmishes with the British force in Northern Haiti. Henry Dundas, 1st Viscount Melville, who was the Secretary of State for War to prime minister William Pitt the Younger, instructed Sir Adam Williamson, the lieutenant-governor of Jamaica, to sign an agreement with representatives of the French colonists that promised to restore the ancien regime, slavery and discrimination against mixed-race colonists, a move that drew criticism from abolitionists William Wilberforce and Thomas Clarkson.

There had long been racial and class tensions between the gens de couleur and enslaved and free blacks in Saint-Domingue, where the enslaved black population outnumbered the white and gens de couleur by ten to one. During the years of warfare against French planters (commonly referred to as grands blancs), racial tensions in Saint-Domingue were exacerbated in competition for power and political alliances.

When tensions arose between full blacks and mulattoes, Pétion frequently supported the mulatto faction. He allied with General André Rigaud and Jean-Pierre Boyer against Toussaint Louverture in a failed rebellion, the so-called "War of Knives", in the South of Saint-Domingue, which began in June 1799. By November, the rebels were pushed back to the strategic southern port of Jacmel; the defence was commanded by Pétion. The town fell in March 1800 and the rebellion was effectively over. Pétion and other mulatto leaders went into exile in France.

In February 1802, General Charles Leclerc arrived with tens of warships and 32,000 French troops to bring Saint-Domingue under more control. Gens de couleur Petion, Boyer, and Rigaud returned with him in the hope of securing power in the colony.

Following the French deportation of Toussaint Louverture and the renewed struggle, Pétion joined the nationalist force in October 1802. This followed a secret conference at Arcahaie, where Pétion supported Jean-Jacques Dessalines, the general who had captured Jacmel. The rebels took the capital of Port-au-Prince on October 17, 1803. Dessalines proclaimed independence on 1 January 1804, naming the nation Haiti. On 6 October 1804, Dessalines declared himself ruler for life and was crowned Emperor of Haiti as Jacques I.

Post-revolution

Disaffected members of Emperor Dessalines's administration, including Pétion and Henri Christophe, began a conspiracy to overthrow Dessalines. Following the assassination of Dessalines on 17 October 1806, Pétion championed the ideals of democracy and clashed with Henri Christophe who wanted absolute rule. Christophe was elected president, but he did not believe the position had sufficient power, as Pétion kept powers for himself. Christophe went to the north with his followers and established an autocracy, declaring the State of Haiti. The loyalties of the country divided between them, and the tensions between the blacks and mulattoes of the North and South, respectively, were reignited.

Pétion was elected President in 1807 of the southern Republic of Haiti. After the inconclusive struggle dragged on until 1810, a peace treaty was agreed to, and the country was split in two. In 1811, Christophe made himself king of the northern Kingdom of Haiti.

On 2 June 1816, Pétion modified the terms of the presidency in the constitution, making himself president for life. Initially a supporter of democracy, Pétion found the constraints imposed on him by the senate onerous and suspended the legislature in 1818.

Pétion seized commercial plantations from the rich gentry. He had the land redistributed to his supporters and the peasantry, earning him the nickname Papa Bon-Cœur ("good-hearted father"). The land seizures and changes in agriculture reduced the production of commodities for the export economy. Most of the population became full subsistence farmers, and exports and state revenue declined sharply, making survival difficult for the new state.

Believing in the importance of education, Pétion started the Lycée Pétion in Port-au-Prince. Petion's virtues and ideals of freedom and democracy for the world (and especially slaves) were strong, and he often showed support for the oppressed. He gave sanctuary to the independence leader Simón Bolívar in 1815 and provided him with material and infantry support. This vital aid played a defining role in Bolivar's success in liberating the countries of what would make up Gran Colombia. Petion was reported to be influenced by his (and his successor's) lover, Marie-Madeleine Lachenais, who acted as his political adviser.

Pétion named General Boyer as his successor; he took control in 1818 following the death of Pétion from yellow fever. After Henry I of the Kingdom of Haiti and his son died in 1820, Boyer reunited the nation under his rule.

References

External links

 Works by Pétion  in the Internet Archive

1770 births
1818 deaths
Deaths from yellow fever
Infectious disease deaths in Haiti
Haitian people of French descent
Haitian people of Mulatto descent
Haitian revolutionaries
Haitian generals
Haitian independence activists
People of Saint-Domingue
Presidents of Haiti
Presidents for life
People from Port-au-Prince
19th-century Haitian politicians
Free people of color